Iodine heptafluoride, also known as iodine(VII) fluoride or iodine fluoride, is an interhalogen compound with the chemical formula IF7.  It has an unusual pentagonal bipyramidal structure, as predicted by VSEPR theory. The molecule can undergo a pseudorotational rearrangement called the Bartell mechanism, which is like the Berry mechanism but for a heptacoordinated system.
It forms colourless crystals, which melt at 4.5 °C: the liquid range is extremely narrow, with the boiling point at 4.77 °C. The dense vapor has a mouldy, acrid odour. The molecule has D5h symmetry.

Preparation
IF7 is prepared by passing F2 through liquid IF5 at 90 °C, then heating the vapours to 270 °C.  Alternatively, this compound can be prepared from fluorine and dried palladium or potassium iodide to minimize the formation of IOF5, an impurity arising by hydrolysis.  Iodine heptafluoride is also produced as a by-product when dioxygenyl hexafluoroplatinate is used to prepare other platinum(V) compounds such as potassium hexafluoroplatinate(V), using potassium fluoride in iodine pentafluoride solution:

2 O2PtF6 + 2 KF + IF5 → 2 KPtF6 + 2 O2 + IF7

Reactions
Iodine heptafluoride decomposes at 200 °C to fluorine gas and iodine pentafluoride.

Safety considerations
IF7 is highly irritating to both the skin and the mucous membranes. It also is a strong oxidizer and can cause fire on contact with organic material.

References

External links
 WebBook page for IF7
National Pollutant Inventory - Fluoride and compounds fact sheet
web elements listing

Fluorides
Iodine compounds
Interhalogen compounds
Oxidizing agents
Hypervalent molecules